The Collegiate Church of St. Peter and St. Guido is a Roman Catholic collegiate church located in the centre of Anderlecht, a municipality of Brussels, Belgium. It is dedicated to Saint Peter and Saint Guy, the patron saint of the Anderlecht.

The church, in Brabantine Gothic style, was built between the 14th and 16th centuries above an earlier Romanesque crypt. Partially attributed to the Flemish architect Jan van Ruysbroeck, it is a notable illustration of late medieval architecture in Brussels. Its neo-Gothic spire dates from the 19th century. The complex was designated a historic monument in 1938.

The church is located on the northern side of the Place de la Vaillance/Dapperheidsplein, not far from Erasmus House, the old beguinage of Anderlecht and the Constant Vanden Stock Stadium (the main football stadium of Anderlecht). This area is served by Saint Guidon/Sint Guido metro station on line 5 of the Brussels Metro.

History

Early history
A first church was founded by a chapter of canons shortly before 1078. This first church was of the Romanesque style, as attested by the 11th century-crypt still remaining beneath the chancel, and which was intended for the worship of relics. In this crypt lies a very old tombstone, resting on two brick pedestals, with no inscription. A long tradition of pilgrimages consider it to be the tomb of Saint Guy, the Poor Man of Anderlecht, who died around 1012. The following centuries, this "tomb" of Saint Guy began to attract a large number of pilgrims, eventually becoming a place of dedication for the saint.

The Brabantine Gothic building that we know today was erected in stages from 1350 to 1527. At that time, Anderlecht was still a village in the outskirts of Brussels counting barely 300 inhabitants. Built in the centre of the village, the church was intended for gatherings much bigger than just the parish community, hence its large size. Jan van Ruysbroeck, the court architect of Philip the Good, who also designed the tower of Brussels' Town Hall, was responsible for the works between 1479 and 1485. , the architect behind the Royal Monastery of Brou (France), designed the portal. The originally square tower dates from 1517.

19th century–present
Restoration works were carried out on the church between 1843 and 1847, under the direction of the architect , which lead to the discovery of several wall paintings from the early 15th and 16th centuries. In 1898, the square tower was surmounted with a neo-Gothic spire, giving the church its current appearance.

The church was designated a historic monument on 25 October 1938. It was the subject of a cleaning campaign from 1994 to 1997.

Gallery

See also

 List of churches in Brussels
 Roman Catholicism in Belgium
 History of Brussels
 Belgium in "the long nineteenth century"

References

Notes

Bibliography
 
 

Roman Catholic churches in Brussels
Anderlecht
Protected heritage sites in Brussels
Gothic architecture in Belgium